"Hit Lerele" is a song performed by Spanish recording artist Beatríz Luengo. It was released as the lead single from Luengo's self-titled second studio album on 6 June 2006. The song features vocals performed by Puerto Rican recording artist Ivy Queen. The song was released exclusively in France along with the second single off the album, "Escape". The song has  sold over 90,000 copies in France alone.

Background
Following the release of her debut studio album, Mi Generación in 2005 and its failed commercial impact, Luengo moved to France where she began recording material for her second studio album.

Track listing

Charts

References

2006 singles
Ivy Queen songs
Songs written by Ivy Queen
2005 songs
Songs written by Yotuel Romero